The Executioner (literally "Spare From The Blade") is a 2015 till 2016 Hong Kong historical fiction television drama produced by TVB. It is set during the Chenghua Emperor's reign in Ming Dynasty, China, and centers on a political conspiracy.

Filming took place from January to April 2015 on location entirely in Hong Kong. It premiered on 7 December 2015, on Hong Kong's broadcast network TVB Jade and Malaysia's cable television channel, Astro On Demand. It ran for 26 episodes, with the last episode airing on 10 January 2016. The Executioner received positive reviews during its broadcast.

Background
The drama is a fictional telling of the events that occurred during Ming dynasty's Chenghua Emperor reign. In actuality, the Chenghua Emperor had taken his nanny who was a mother figure to him as a consort. Consort Wan as she became known was twice the age of the Emperor, he was eighteen and she was thirty-five at the time she became his consort, but she became his favorite consort and gave birth to a son who died soon after. However Consort Wan was also an unscrupulous person who along with high ranking eunuchs would sell government titles to anyone willing to pay a high price. In terms those who bought these titles illegally would abuse their titles by raising taxes to unreasonable amounts in their county's or deal in illegal activities without getting punishment. The Emperor who did not want to offend Consort Wan would turn a blind eye on these issues. Unable to bear the Emperor a child, fearing others will be favored by the Emperor and also to continue her hold on the Emperor, Consort Wan would command her servants and eunuchs to force abortion on any consorts that became pregnant with the Emperor's child. If any consort did get the chance to carry the Emperor's child to birth both mother and child would soon be murdered. After finding out a concubine named Ji is pregnant, Empress Wu protects her and the unborn child by entrusting them in the care of the gate keeper, but Consort Wan's finds out and seeks to murder the gate keeper, Concubine Ji and her child. The child survives and is reunited with Emperor Chenghua at age five. The child later grows up to be the future Hongzhi Emperor.

Synopsis
One takes away life; the other welcomes life. Midwife Fa Yui-hung and executioner Yip Sheung-luk come together when they must protect a new life who is wanted dead by the Imperial government.

During Ming dynasty's Chenghua Emperor reign, Fa Yui-hung is the most renowned midwife in the capital. Her services are highly sought after by the rich and poor. She is a compassionate person that won't do harm to others even if she is paid a high price. One night a mysterious man Yip Sheung-luk shows up at her door step claiming to be the savior of her father-in-law who is away on a journey. As her father-in-law's savior, Sheung-luk claims he was welcomed to stay at the Bak household. After finding items in her home missing Yui-hung trails Sheung-luk around town, only to find that he is hiding a heavily pregnant woman who he is tasked to protect. Yui-hung agrees to help the pregnant woman, but Sheung-luk refuses to tell her the identity or background of the pregnant woman.

After saving the life of the local warden from an escaped fugitive, Sheung-luk is offered the position as the towns executioner. As he sees it as a profession everyone in town sees him as a murderer including Yui-hung who mocks him whenever she gets a chance. No one wants to be associated with him and in order to receive company he goes to the local brothel just to pay for any courtesan willing to keep him company while he has dinner.

Walking through the woods one night Sheung-luk and Yui-hung finds a ditch with a pregnant woman left for dead. After the woman dies Yui-hung immediately instructs Sheung-luk to save the baby inside the dead woman. After the baby boy is born Yui-hung wants to bring the baby to the authorities but Sheung-luk knows the dead woman was not a regular person by looking at her accessories and clothing. In order to protect him and his savior's daughter-in-law, he advises Yui-hung not to go to the authorities yet. The new born baby boy soon gets them both in trouble when they become the most wanted criminals in the kingdom. The two go through many dangers to keep themselves alive and protect the baby boy with a mysterious connection to the Chenghua Emperor.

Cast

Bak family/household
Maggie Shiu as Fa Yui-hung 花蕊紅
Bowie Wu as Bak Chin-chung 白千松
Law Lok-lam as Fa Choi-san 花在山
Hebe Chan as Chiu Sui-ying 趙小櫻
Max Choi as Lok Yeung 洛陽

Imperial prison department
Kenny Wong as Yip Sheung-luk 葉常綠
Glen Lee as Mak Sau-ching 墨守成
Louis Szeto as Yan 仁
Mark Ma as Yee 義
Kelvin Yuen as Lai 禮
Man Yeung as Chi 智

Yin Hung Garden brothel
Mat Yeung as Chek Tsz-chau 赤知秋
Katy Kung as Chuk Siu-moon 祝小滿
Leo Tsang as Yue Gwai 饒歸
Samantha Chuk as Leung Bo 梁保
Rachel Kan as Chek Ching-ha 赤映霞
Roxanne Tong as San Yut 新月
Matthew Chu as Ah Gau 阿九
Kayley Chung as Yin-yin 燕燕
Siu Koi-yan as Ang-ang 鶯鶯
Nicole Wan as May Leung 媚娘
Helen Seng as Siu Kam 小琴

Imperial Court
Stanley Cheung as Chenghua Emperor 明宪宗朱見深
Jess Sum as Empress Wu 吳皇后
Akina Hong as Consort Wan 萬貞兒
Hugo Ng as Lee Chi-sing 李孜省
Jimmy Au as Tai Wai-yan 戴懷恩
Joel Chan as Sima Chau 司馬丑
Chan Wing-chun as Cheung Ping 章平
Eddie Li as Pang Gwai 彭貴
Cheung Chun-ping as Chow Tai 周泰
Judy Tsang as Kei Siu-guan 紀小娟
Rocky Cheng as Kam On 金安
Alex Lam as Siu Tak-chi 小德子
Lucy Li as Yuk Cham 玉簪 
Deborah Poon as Ling Yung 凌容

Extended cast
Elaine Yiu as Yuen So-sam 阮素心
Mak Ka-lun as Wing Siu-ho 榮兆豪
Kitty Lau as Kau Cho 裘棗
Kelvin Lee as Lau Seung-hei 劉雙囍
Kedar Wong as Wo Him 和謙
Lee Yee-man as Sik Cheung-yee 翟霜兒
Yeung Chiu-hoi as Cheung Hon-lam 張翰林
Mok Wai-man as Senior Sik 翟老爺
Gary Tam as Choi Chin-wan 蔡展雲
Jones Lee as Yen Tai-bak 殷泰伯
Derek Wong as Mysterious person 神秘人
Wang Wai-tak as Ling Kim-fung 凌劍鋒
Snow Suen as Liu Ching-ching 呂青青

Development 
The costume fitting ceremony was held on January 7, 2015 at 12:30 pm Tseung Kwan O TVB City Studio One Common Room.
The blessing ceremony was held on March 5, 2015 at 2:00 pm Tseung Kwan O TVB City Studio Thirteen.
Filming took place from January to April 2015 at TVB Ancient City backlot and on location around Hong Kong.

Viewership ratings

International broadcast

Awards and nominations

References

External links
The Executioner TVB Official Website 

TVB dramas
Hong Kong television series
2015 Hong Kong television series debuts
2016 Hong Kong television series endings
2010s Hong Kong television series